The Embassy of the State of Palestine in China is the diplomatic mission of the State of Palestine in China. It is located in Sanlitun in Beijing.

See also

List of diplomatic missions in China.
List of diplomatic missions of Palestine.

References

China
Palestine
China–State of Palestine relations